Wu Ban ( 221–239), courtesy name Yuanxiong, was a Chinese military general of the state of Shu Han in the Three Kingdoms period of China.

Life
Wu Ban was a son of Wu Kuang (吳匡), an official who served under the general He Jin during the reign of Emperor Ling ( 168–189) in the Eastern Han dynasty. Like his older relative Wu Yi, he served as a military general in the state of Shu Han during the Three Kingdoms period and held appointments/positions which were second to those held by Wu Yi. He was known for being bold and chivalrous. During the short reign of Liu Bei ( 221–223), the founder and first emperor of Shu, Wu Ban served as a lingjun (領軍; a military commander).

Wu Ban participated in the Battle of Xiaoting of 221–222 against Shu's ally-turned-rival state, Eastern Wu. In the initial stages of the battle, the units led by Wu Ban and Feng Xi attacked and captured Wu positions at the Wu Gorge, which were guarded by the Wu officers Li Yi (李異) and Liu E (劉阿). As the Shu army advanced further, Liu Bei ordered Wu Ban and Chen Shi to lead the Shu navy to station at Yiling (夷陵; southeast of present-day Yichang, Hubei) in between the east and west banks of the Yangtze. After the Shu army passed through the Wu Gorge, Liu Bei instructed Wu Ban to lead a few thousand soldiers out of the mountainous terrain and set up camps on flat ground to provoke the Wu forces to attack them, but failed to lure the enemy out into a trap. The Shu forces ultimately lost the Battle of Xiaoting and retreated back to Shu.

Sometime before 231, Wu Ban held the appointment General of the Rear (後將軍) and was enfeoffed as the Marquis of Anle Village (安樂亭侯). Wu Ban participated at least to Zhuge Liang's fourth northern campaign against Wei where during the  Battle of Mount Qi in 231 along with the officers Wei Yan and Gao Xiang  they scored a major victory against Wei army led by Sima Yi, when they killed 3,000 Wei soldiers and seized 5,000 sets of armour and 3,100 crossbows. Sima Yi was forced to retreat back to his camp.

Later in 237, he succeeded his cousin Wu Yi as General of Agile Cavalry (驃騎將軍), granted imperial authority, and elevated from a village marquis to a county marquis under the title "Marquis of Mianzhu" (綿竹侯). Wu Ban's maintained the appointment until at least 239, he is thought to have died by 243 where Deng Zhi is promoted to General of Agile Cavalry. Yang Xi's Ji Han Fuchen Zan written in 241 would have surely featured Ban so it further suggests his death is after.

In Romance of the Three Kingdoms
In the 14th-century historical novel Romance of the Three Kingdoms, which romanticises the events before and during the Three Kingdoms period, Wu Ban is killed in battle during one of Zhuge Liang's military campaigns against Shu's rival state Wei. He is hit by arrows fired by archers under the command of the Wei officers Zhang Hu (張虎; Zhang Liao's son) and Yue Lin (樂綝; Yue Jin's son), falls into a river and dies.

See also
 Lists of people of the Three Kingdoms

References

 Chen, Shou (3rd century). Records of the Three Kingdoms (Sanguozhi).
 Luo, Guanzhong (14th century). Romance of the Three Kingdoms (Sanguo Yanyi).
 Pei, Songzhi (5th century). Annotations to Records of the Three Kingdoms (Sanguozhi zhu).
 Sima, Guang (1084). Zizhi Tongjian.

Year of birth unknown
Year of death unknown
Liu Zhang and associates
Shu Han generals